Günter Schabowski (4 January 1929 – 1 November 2015) was an East German politician who served as an official of the Socialist Unity Party of Germany (Sozialistische Einheitspartei Deutschlands abbreviated SED), the ruling party during most of the existence of the German Democratic Republic (GDR). Schabowski gained worldwide fame in November 1989 when he improvised a slightly mistaken answer to a press conference question. That raised popular expectations much more rapidly than the government planned and so massive crowds gathered the same night at the Berlin Wall, which forced its opening after 28 years. Soon afterward, the entire inner German border was opened.

Background
Schabowski was born in Anklam, Pomerania (then in the Free State of Prussia, now part of the federal state of Mecklenburg-Vorpommern). He studied journalism at the  Karl Marx University, Leipzig, after which he became editor of the trade union magazine, Tribüne. In 1952, he became a member of the SED. From 1967 to 1968, he attended the party academy of the CPSU. In 1978, he became the chief editor of the newspaper Neues Deutschland ("New Germany"), which as the official organ of the SED was considered to be the leading newspaper in the GDR. In 1981, he became a member of the SED Central Committee.  In 1985, after leaving Neues Deutschland, he became the First Secretary of the East Berlin chapter of the SED and a member of the SED Politbüro. He also served as member of the Volkskammer from 1981 to 1990. In 2009, writer Christa Wolf called Schabowski "one of the worst" East German politicians before the Wende, saying: "I remember a few appearances of him in front of the writer's guild. You were scared of him."

Opening of Berlin Wall 

In October 1989, Schabowski, along with several other members of the Politbüro, turned on the longtime SED leader Erich Honecker and forced him to step down in favor of Egon Krenz.  As part of the effort to change the regime's image, Schabowski was named the regime's unofficial spokesman and he held several daily press conferences to announce changes. He had already been in charge of media affairs for the Politbüro. He was also reportedly named the second man in the SED, Krenz's old role. Schabowski had spent most of his career in communist-style journalism in which reporters were told what to write after events had already happened. Thus, he found it somewhat difficult to get used to Western-style media practice.

On 9 November 1989, shortly before that day's press conference, Krenz handed Schabowski a text containing new, temporary travel regulations. The text stipulated that East German citizens could apply for permission to travel abroad without having to meet the previous requirements for those trips, and it allowed for permanent emigration across all border crossings, including those between East and West Berlin. The text was supposed to be embargoed until the next morning.

Schabowski had not been on hand when Krenz read the text earlier in the day to several Politbüro members during a cigarette break at that day's Central Committee plenum or when it was discussed before the full committee. However, he felt comfortable discussing it at the press conference; he said later that all one needed to do to conduct a press conference was be able to speak German and read a text without mistakes. Accordingly, he read the note aloud at the end of the press conference. One of the reporters asked when the regulations would come into effect. Schabowski assumed that it would be the same day based on the wording of the note, and he replied after a few seconds' pause: "As far as I know... effective immediately, without delay." Accounts differ on who asked that question. Both Riccardo Ehrman, the Berlin correspondent of the ANSA news agency, and the German Bild Zeitung (a tabloid) reporter Peter Brinkmann were sitting in the front row at the press conference and claimed to have asked when the regulations would come into force.

Later, when asked whether the new regulations also applied to travel between East and West Berlin, Schabowski looked at the text again and discovered that they did. When Daniel Johnson of The Daily Telegraph asked what that meant for the Berlin Wall, Schabowski sat frozen before giving a rambling statement about the wall being tied to the larger disarmament question.

After the press conference, Schabowski sat down for a live interview with NBC's Tom Brokaw. When Brokaw asked him if it was indeed true that East Germans could now travel without having to go through a third country, Schabowski replied in broken English that East Germans were "not further forced to leave GDR by transit through another country," and could now "go through the border." When Brokaw asked if this meant "freedom of travel," Schabowski replied, "Yes of course," and added that it was not "a question of tourism" but "a permission of leaving GDR."

The West German public national television channels showed parts of Schabowski's press conference in their main evening news reports at 7:17 PM on ZDF's heute and at 8 PM on ARD's  Tagesschau, which meant that the news was broadcast to nearly all of East Germany as well, where West German television was widely watched. The news then spread like wildfire with news reports continuing to repeat the news throughout the night.

As the night progressed, thousands of East Berliners began proceeding to the six border crossings along the Berlin Wall and demanded to be let through. Live television reported on the gathering people which only increased the numbers of East Berliners coming to the gates. The crowds vastly outnumbered the border guards, who tried initially to stall for time. However, no one was willing to order deadly force. Finally, at 11:30 pm, Stasi Officer Harald Jäger decided to open the gates at the Bornholmer Straße border crossing and to allow people into West Berlin.

The fall of the Berlin Wall was the key event leading to the end of the East German regime, a state that had been crumbling for many weeks as citizens had been fleeing through intermediate countries surrounding East Germany. Indeed, Victor Sebestyen later wrote that when the gates were opened, for all intents and purposes, East Germany "ceased to exist". He also wrote that many of Schabowski's colleagues suspected he was either an American or West German agent and could not believe that he had made "a simple cock-up". In 2014, his wife claimed that Schabowski had been well aware of the possible consequences of what he said in the press conference.

In the following purges of the "party's old guard", Schabowski was quickly expelled from the Party of Democratic Socialism, the successor to the SED, in an attempt to improve the party's image. Just months earlier, he had been awarded the country's prestigious Order of Karl Marx.

Political life after reunification

After German Reunification, Schabowski became highly critical of his own actions in East Germany and those of his fellow Politbüro members as well as of Soviet-style socialism in general. He worked again as a journalist and between 1992 and 1999, as editor for Heimat-Nachrichten, a weekly local paper that he co-founded with a West German journalist in Rotenburg an der Fulda.

His support for the Christian Democratic Union of Germany (CDU) prompted some of his former comrades to call him a wryneck (German: Wendehals), a bird that can turn its head almost 180 degrees and a popular term used to mock communists who have turned capitalist.

Together with other leading figures of the GDR regime, he was charged with the murders of East Germans attempting to flee the GDR. In January 1995, Berlin prosecutors pressed charges against him. In August 1997, Schabowski was convicted along with Egon Krenz and Günther Kleiber. Because he accepted his moral guilt and denounced the GDR, he was sentenced to only three years in prison. In December 1999, he began serving his sentence in Hakenfelde Prison in Spandau. However, in September 2000, he was pardoned by Governing Mayor Eberhard Diepgen and released in December 2000 after he had served only a year. He was critical of the PDS/Left Party, the successor to the Socialist Unity Party. In 2001, he collaborated with Bärbel Bohley as advisor to Frank Steffel (CDU).

Death
According to his wife, Schabowski lived in a Berlin nursing home during the last years of his life, after a number of heart attacks and strokes. He died in Berlin, after a long illness, on the morning of 1 November 2015, aged 86.

References

External links

1929 births
2015 deaths
People from Anklam
People from the Province of Pomerania
Members of the Politburo of the Central Committee of the Socialist Unity Party of Germany
Members of the 8th Volkskammer
Members of the 9th Volkskammer
Free German Youth members
Free German Trade Union Federation members
Neues Deutschland editors
German male journalists
Berlin Wall
Leipzig University alumni
German politicians convicted of crimes
Recipients of German pardons
Recipients of the Patriotic Order of Merit in gold
Recipients of the Banner of Labor
Recipients of the Order of Friendship of Peoples
20th-century German criminals
Prisoners and detainees of Germany
Criminals from Mecklenburg-Western Pomerania